Lindenhurst Senior High School (LHS) is a public high school in Lindenhurst, New York on the South Shore of Long Island. The high school is the sole high school of the Lindenhurst Union Free School District, which includes the Village of Lindenhurst and North Lindenhurst.

Notable alumni
This is a partial list of notable alumni of Lindenhurst Senior High School. Names on this list should either have an accompanying existing article link which verifies they are an alumnus, or reliable sources as footnotes against the name showing they are a notable alumnus.

Gia Allemand (Class of 2001) - actress, model, and reality television contestant
Jack Barry (Class of 1935) - television personality
Pat Benatar (Class of 1971) - four-time Grammy Award winning singer
Teddy Castellucci (Class of 1983) - composer
Stephanie Finochio (Class of 1989) - stuntwoman, actress and professional wrestler, who competed for Total Nonstop Action Wrestling and World Wrestling Entertainment
Charles J. Gradante (Class of 1963) hedge fund expert
Ryan LaFlare - retired adult actor mixed martial arts fighter, competed in the Welterweight division for the Ultimate Fighting Championship
Dan Lauria (Class of 1965) - actor
Joe Levelis (Class of 1979) - former USFL player
Sal LoCascio (Class of 1985) - Hall of Fame former Lacrosse goaltender and coach
Doug Murray (comics) (Class of 1965), Co-creator and writer of the award-winning Marvel Comics series The 'Nam 
Rosanne Sorrentino (Class of 1986) - actress
Jeremy Ruckert (Class of 2018) - Tight End for the New York Jets

Notable faculty
Joy Behar, From the late 1960s to the early 1970s, she taught English

See also

List of bulldog mascots

References

External links

Babylon (town), New York
Public high schools in New York (state)
Schools in Suffolk County, New York